Kanakamamidi Swamy Goud (born 5 July 1954) is an Indian
Politician from Telangana Rashtra Samithi. He Joined Bharatiya Janatha Party in 2020 and quit in 2022. He was the Chairman of Telangana Legislative Council from 2014–2019. He was the Politician of TRS from 2012 to 2020. He is convener of Telangana Joint Action Committee. He is a member of TRS politburo.

Goud won the legislative council seat from Karimnagar graduate constituency that went to polls with five other seats on 21 February. Goud polled 33,000 first preferential votes to win the Karimnagar graduates' seat.

Early life
Goud was born in Kismatpur, Rajendranagar mandal, Ranga Reddy district of Telangana.

Career
He worked with Andhra Pradesh Government for over 30 years. He was an active member of the trade union.

He started his career as an Attender.

During the 1977 cyclone in Krishna district, he helped perform cremations, supplying clothes and food under the guidance of Thomas.

He was a prominent activist for Telangana statehood and actively participated in many agitations. He was one of the people behind the employees strike for Telangana called Sakala Janula Samme. He retired from government service on 31 July 2012.

He joined Telangana Rashtra Samithi in November 2012 and was made its Politburo member. He was elected as an MLC from Karimnagar by securing 92.68% beating previous record of 85% by Atal Bihari Vajpayee.

K Swamy Goud resigned to TRS and joined BJP on 2020 November 26 in the presence of BJP national president J. P. Nadda in Delhi and later resigned to BJP and rejoined TRS in the presence of party's working president and K. T. Rama Rao on 21 October 2022 in Hyderabad.

References

Telangana Rashtra Samithi politicians
1952 births
Living people
Chairs of the Telangana Legislative Council
Members of the Telangana Legislative Council
21st-century Indian politicians